William Cecil Glenn Atkinson (born October 4, 1954) is a Canadian former professional baseball player and a former Major League Baseball (MLB) relief pitcher.

Professional career

Montreal Expos
In , Atkinson's first professional season, he was assigned to the Short-Season Jamestown Falcons. He was 3–3 with a 3.60 ERA in 19 games, all in relief.

He was 8–7 with a 3.03 ERA in 35 games, 13 starts.

In  Atkinson was promoted to the Double-A Quebec Carnavals. He compiled a record of 7–8 with a 3.70 ERA in 33 games, 20 for starts.

He was promoted to the Triple-A Memphis Blues where he compiled a record of 3–4 with a 2.80 ERA with 5 saves in 49 games, three starts.

At the age of 21 Atkinson split the  season between the Triple-A Denver Bears and Montreal. With Denver he was 6–3 with a 3.99 ERA with 15 saves in 51 games, all in relief. Atkinson made his MLB debut against the St. Louis Cardinals on September 18 at Jarry Park Stadium. He entered game one of the doubleheader in the top of the fourth with Montreal trailing 4–0, and he proceeded to pitch three scoreless innings of relief before being lifted for a pinch hitter. He had allowed three hits, struck out one, and walked no one. He finished the season pitching five scoreless innings in four games.

In  Atkinson spent the entire season with the Expos. He went 7–2 with a 3.35 ERA with seven in 55 games. Atkinson spent the entire '77 season with the Expos, the only time in his career this would be achieved.

Atkinson split the  season between the Expos and the Bears. With the Expos he compiled a record of 2–2 with a 4.37 ERA in 14 games. With the Bears he was 1–3 with a dismal 7.41 ERA in 23 games.

In Atkinson's last season with the Expos organization, he again split the season between the Bears and the Expos. With the Bears he was 9–6 with a 4.14 ERA in 36 games, 23 starts. With the Expos he was 2–0 with a 1.98 ERA in 10 games.

Chicago White Sox
Atkinson was purchased by the Chicago White Sox on December 12,  but never again reached the major league level.

With the Iowa Oaks in the  he compiled a record of 3–5 with a 4.60 ERA in 55 games, two starts.

In  with the Triple-A Edmonton Trappers Atkinson went 8–8 with a 5.48 ERA in 36 games, 16 starts.

His last two seasons were spent up and down the White Sox organization. In  with the Double-A Glens Falls White Sox he went 6–9 with a 2.85 ERA in 56 games, two starts. He split the  season between the Class-A Appleton Foxes and the Triple-A Denver Bears going a combined 6–5 with a 3.71 ERA in 32 games, five starts.

Personal life
After retirement, he returned to Chatham and played senior baseball there until 1999.

See also 
 List of Major League Baseball players from Canada

References

External links 
 or Retrosheet

1954 births
Living people
Appleton Foxes players
Baseball people from Ontario
Canadian expatriate baseball players in the United States
Denver Bears players
Edmonton Trappers players
Glens Falls White Sox players
Iowa Oaks players
Jamestown Falcons players
Major League Baseball pitchers
Major League Baseball players from Canada
Memphis Blues players
Montreal Expos players
Québec Carnavals players
Sportspeople from Chatham-Kent
West Palm Beach Expos players